The Swiss Junior Curling Championships are the national championships of men's and women's junior curling teams in Switzerland. Junior level curlers must be under the age of 21. The championships have been held annually since 1972 for junior men and since 1984 for junior women. The championships are organized by the Swiss Curling Association.

Men

Champions

Champions and medallists
Team line-ups shows in order: fourth, third, second, lead, alternate, coach; skips marked bold.

Women

Champions

Champions and medallists
Team line-ups shows in order: fourth, third, second, lead, alternate, coach; skips marked bold.

References

External links
Archiv Nachwuchs - swisscurling
Swiss Curling Association Champions
Erfolge des Curling Club Dübendorf

See also
Swiss Men's Curling Championship
Swiss Women's Curling Championship
Swiss Mixed Doubles Curling Championship
Swiss Mixed Curling Championship
Swiss Wheelchair Curling Championship
Swiss Senior Curling Championships

Curling competitions in Switzerland
National curling championships
1972 establishments in Switzerland
1984 establishments in Switzerland
Recurring sporting events established in 1972
Recurring sporting events established in 1984
Annual sporting events in Switzerland
Youth sport in Switzerland
National youth sports competitions
Youth curling